Stephen Gordon Hendry  (born 13 January 1969) is a Scottish professional snooker player who dominated the sport during the 1990s, becoming one of the most successful players in its history. After turning professional in 1985 at age 16, Hendry rose rapidly through the rankings, reaching number four in the world by the end of his third professional season. He won his first World Snooker Championship in 1990 aged 21 years and 106 days, surpassing Alex Higgins as the sport's youngest world champion, a record he still holds. From 1990 to 1999, he won seven world titles, setting a modern-era record that stood outright until Ronnie O'Sullivan equalled it in 2022. Hendry also won the Masters six times and the UK Championship five times for a career total of 18 Triple Crown tournament wins, a total exceeded only by O'Sullivan's 21. His total of 36 ranking titles is second only to O'Sullivan's 39, while his nine seasons as world number one were the most by any player under the annual ranking system used until 2010. 

Hendry won five consecutive Masters titles between 1989 and 1993 and five consecutive world titles between 1992 and 1996, both records in the modern era. His 36 consecutive victories in ranking events between March 1990 and January 1991 and his 29 consecutive wins at the Crucible between 1992 and 1997 also remain modern-era records. One of three players to have won all three Triple Crown events in a single season, he is the only player to have achieved the feat twice, in the 1989–90 and 1995–96 seasons. His 776 career century breaks include 11 maximum breaks, putting him behind only O'Sullivan (15) and John Higgins (12) for the most officially recognised maximums in professional competition.

Hendry's form became less consistent after his sixth world title in 1996 and his career declined in the 2000s, his play increasingly affected by the yips. He reached the last of his nine world finals at the 2002 World Championship but lost in a deciding frame to Peter Ebdon. He won his last ranking title at the 2005 Malta Cup and reached his last ranking final at the 2006 UK Championship, again losing to Ebdon. In the 2011–12 season, he fell out of the top 16 in the world rankings for the first time in 23 years. Although he qualified for the 2012 World Championship, where he made his 27th consecutive Crucible appearance, he announced his retirement from professional snooker at age 43 after losing in the quarter-finals of the event. After almost nine years in retirement, he returned to the professional tour in 2021 under an invitational tour card. Hendry also competes on the World Seniors Tour and regularly features as a commentator and studio pundit for snooker coverage on BBC and ITV. Awarded an MBE in 1994, he was twice named the BBC Scotland Sports Personality of the Year, in 1987 and 1996.

Career

Amateur years (1981–1985)
Hendry started playing snooker in 1981, aged 12, when his father bought him a child-sized snooker table as a Christmas present. In 1983, he won the Scottish Under-16 Championship, and made his first televised appearance on Junior Pot Black. In 1984, aged 15, he became the youngest ever winner of the Scottish Amateur Championship. In 1985, after retaining the Scottish Amateur Championship, he turned professional aged 16 years and three months; he was then the sport's youngest ever professional. He was managed by entrepreneur Ian Doyle.

Early professional years (1985–1988)
In the 1985–86 season, Hendry won the Scottish Professional Championship, becoming the youngest player to do so. He qualified for the 1986 World Snooker Championship, losing 8–10  to Willie Thorne in the first round on his debut. Aged 17 years and 3 months, he was then the youngest player to compete at the final stages of a world championship, a record he held for 26 years until Luca Brecel made his Crucible debut in 2012 aged two months younger.

In the 1986–87 season, Hendry retained his Scottish Professional Championship title. He reached his first ranking semi-final at the Classic, but lost 3–9 to Steve Davis. Hendry and Mike Hallett won the 1987 World Doubles Championship, defeating Dennis Taylor and Cliff Thorburn 12–6 in the final. He reached the quarter-finals of the 1987 World Championship, but lost 12–13 to defending champion Joe Johnson, despite coming from 1–8 and 8–12 behind to force a deciding frame.

In the 1987–88 season, Hendry won his first ranking title, beating Taylor 10–7 in the final of the Grand Prix. He captured his second ranking title at the British Open, where he defeated Hallett 13–2 in the final. He also won his third consecutive Scottish Professional Championship. By the end of his third professional season, he reached number four in the world rankings and was named the BBC Scotland Sports Personality of the Year for 1987. Although he failed to win a ranking title during the 1988–89 season, he won the Masters on his debut, defeating John Parrott 9–6 in the final. He reached his first world semi-final at the 1989 World Championship, but lost 9–16 to the eventual champion Davis.

World Champion and World Number One (1989–1999)
The 1989–90 season marked the beginning of Hendry's period of dominance. He won his first UK Championship, defeating Davis 16–12 in the final; won his second Masters, defeating Parrott 9–4 in the final; and won his first world title at the 1990 World Championship, beating Jimmy White 18–12 in the final. He became the second player to win all three Triple Crown events in the same season, after Davis had first achieved the feat two seasons earlier. Aged 21 years and 106 days, he superseded Alex Higgins as the sport's youngest world champion, a record he still holds. He also won ranking titles at the Dubai Classic and Asian Open, and became world number one for the first time at the end of the season.

In the 1990–91 season, Hendry became the first player to win five ranking titles in a single season, including his second UK Championship, where he defeated Davis 16–15 in the final. He also won his third Masters, defeating Hallett 9–8 in the final after trailing 0–7 and 2–8. However, he failed to retain his world title, falling victim to the Crucible curse as he lost 11–13 to Steve James in the quarter-finals, despite having led 11–9. In the 1991–92 season, he won his fourth Masters, defeating Parrott 9–4 in the final, and won his second world title at the 1992 World Championship, where he came from 8–14 behind in the final to win ten consecutive frames for an 18–14 victory over White. He achieved his first maximum break in professional competition while playing Thorne in the Matchroom League. In the 1992–93 season, he won his fifth consecutive Masters, beating James Wattana 9–5 in the final, and won his third world title at the 1993 World Championship, defeating White 18–5 in the final with a session to spare, having lost just 25 frames in the tournament. In the 1993–94 season, he reached the final of the UK Championship but lost 6–10 to Ronnie O'Sullivan, who won his maiden ranking title at the event. Hendry reached a sixth consecutive Masters final, but lost 8–9 to his compatriot Alan McManus, his first defeat at the Masters. He won his fourth world title at the 1994 World Championship, clinching an 18–17 victory after White missed a black off the spot in the deciding frame of the final. It was the last time White featured in a World Championship final, having lost all six finals he contested, four of them to Hendry.

In 1994, Hendry was awarded an MBE. In the 1994–95 season, he won his third UK Championship, defeating Ken Doherty 10–5 in the final and setting a new record for the most centuries in a professional match, with seven. This still holds the record for the most centuries in a 19-frame match as well as jointly holding the record (with Judd Trump and Ding Junhui) for the most centuries in any professional contest. Snooker journalist Dave Hendon described Hendry's performance in the 1994 UK final as "possibly the best anybody has ever played". Hendry ended the season by winning the 1995 World Championship, defeating O'Sullivan 13–8 in the quarter-finals, White 16–12 in the semi-finals, and Nigel Bond 18–9 in the final to claim his fifth world title.

In the 1995–96 season, Hendry again won all three Triple Crown events: He defeated Peter Ebdon 10–3 to win his fourth UK Championship, defeated O'Sullivan 10–5 to win his sixth Masters, and defeated Ebdon 18–12 in the 1996 World Championship final to win his sixth world title, equalling the modern-era record held by Ray Reardon and Steve Davis. Hendry remains the only player to win all three Triple Crown events in two different seasons. He was named the BBC Scotland Sports Personality of the Year for a second time in 1996. In the 1996–97 season, Hendry won his fifth UK Championship, coming from 4–8 behind to defeat John Higgins 10–9 in the final. In the best-of-17 Liverpool Victoria Charity Challenge final, he led O'Sullivan 8–2 but O'Sullivan won six consecutive frames to take the match to a deciding frame. However, Hendry won the decider with a maximum break for a 9–8 victory, making him the only player to make a maximum break in the deciding frame of a final. At the 1997 World Championship, Hendry reached a sixth consecutive world final but lost 12–18 to Doherty, his first defeat in a world final and his first loss at the Crucible since 1991. His 29 consecutive victories at the Crucible over that period remains a record.

Hendry won only one ranking title in the 1997–98 season, despite reaching two of the three Triple Crown finals. He lost the UK Championship final 6–10 to O'Sullivan. In the 1998 Masters final, he led Williams 9–6, needing just one frame for victory. However, Williams took the match to a deciding frame and went on to win on a re-spotted black. At the 1998 World Championship, Hendry lost 4–10 to White in the first round. After eight consecutive seasons as world number one, he fell to second place in the rankings behind the new world champion John Higgins. In the 1998–99 season, he suffered a shock 0–9 whitewash to world number 73 Marcus Campbell in the first round of the UK Championship. It was then the heaviest professional defeat of Hendry's career, surpassing his 1–9 loss to Thorburn in the semi-finals of the 1987 International Open. Afterwards, Hendry stated that his confidence had "drained and drained" and that he would have to go "back to the drawing board" to recover his form. However, at the 1999 World Championship, he defeated O'Sullivan 17–13 in the semi-finals and Williams 18–11 in the final to win his seventh and last world title at age 30. Hendry held the modern-era record of seven world titles outright for the next 23 years, until O'Sullivan equalled it in 2022.

Later career (1999–2012)
In the 1999–2000 season, Hendry won the British Open, where he made the fifth 147 break of his career, which was also the first maximum made in a ranking final. However, he suffered a surprise 7–10 defeat to debutant Stuart Bingham in the first round of the 2000 World Championship. In the 2000–01 season, Hendry failed to win any ranking titles for the first time since the 1988–89 season, reaching only one final. In the 2001–02 season, he won the European Open and came close to an eighth world title at the 2002 World Championship, where he defeated the defending champion O'Sullivan 17–13 in the semi-finals but lost 17–18 to Ebdon in the final. This was Hendry's last appearance in a World Championship final, after featuring in nine of the 13 finals held between 1990 and 2002. He made 16 centuries during the 2002 event, a record that stood outright for the next 20 years until Williams equalled it in 2022.

Hendry won the Welsh Open in the 2002–03 season, and won the British Open in the 2003–04 season. Returning from the Euro-Asia Masters Challenge in September 2003, he had his cue broken in the luggage hold of his international flight, where players had been required to stow their cues since the 11 September 2001 attacks. Hendry had received the cue as a gift from his parents when he was 14, and had used it when winning all seven of his world titles. Hendry reached the semi-finals of the 2004 World Championship but lost 4–17 to O’Sullivan with a session to spare, his heaviest defeat in a world semi-final. In the 2004–05 season, he was runner-up at the Welsh Open, losing 8–9 to O'Sullivan. The following month, he defeated fellow Scot Graeme Dott 9–7 to win the Malta Cup, his 36th and last ranking title.

Hendry regained the world number one ranking for the 2005–06 season due to his consistency in reaching the latter stages of tournaments without, by his own admission, reproducing his form of old. It was his ninth season as world number one, which holds the record under the annual ranking system used until 2010. The following season, Hendry took a 4–1 lead over O'Sullivan in the 2006 UK Championship quarter-finals, only for O'Sullivan to unexpectedly concede the best-of-17-frame match during the sixth frame. After O'Sullivan walked out of the arena, Hendry was awarded a 9–1 win. He came from 5–7 down in the semi-finals to defeat Dott 9–7, but lost the final 6–10 to Ebdon. It was the last time Hendry reached a ranking final. Following a disappointing 2007–08 season, he reached his 12th world semi-final at the 2008 World Championship, surpassing Davis's previous record of 11 semi-finals. Aged 39, he was the oldest player to reach the semi-finals since Terry Griffiths in 1992, but he lost 6–17 to O'Sullivan with a session to spare. He lost all eight frames in the second session of the match, his first session whitewash at the Crucible.

Hendry also had a poor 2008–09 season, although his 10–7 win over Williams in the first round of the 2009 World Championship guaranteed that he would remain in the top sixteen of the rankings for the following season. He defeated Ding 13–10 in the second round, winning his 1000th frame at the Crucible. In the quarter-finals, he made a maximum break against Shaun Murphy, but lost the match 11–13. Aged 40, he was at the time the oldest player to make a maximum in a ranking tournament and the second player after O'Sullivan to make more than one 147 at the Crucible. Hendry ended the season ranked 10th, the first time he had been outside the top eight since the 1987–88 season.

In the 2009–10 season, Hendry reached the quarter-finals of the China Open, but lost 4–5 to Mark Allen, despite leading 4–2. In the Masters, he lost 4–6 to Murphy in the first round. In the 2010 World Championship, he lost 5–13 to Mark Selby in the second round. He participated in a challenge match against Ding in Beijing, but lost 6–13.
In the 2010–11 season, Hendry defeated White 9–8 in the first round of the 2010 UK Championship, but lost 6–9 in the second round to Williams. Afterwards, he expressed his frustration with his form and revealed that he has been suffering from "the yips" for ten years, leaving him unable to cue through the ball and causing him to miss routine shots. He lost 3–6 to reigning world champion Neil Robertson in the Masters. He made his tenth professional maximum break at the Welsh Open against Stephen Maguire, but lost the match. At the China Open he whitewashed Matthew Stevens 5–0 in the first round, before losing 2–5 to Ding in the second round. At the 2011 World Championship, he beat Joe Perry in a first-round decider, but again lost in the second round to Selby, this time by a score of 4–13.

In the 2011–12 season, after losing to Robert Milkins in the first round of the Shanghai Masters, Hendry fell to 21st in the world rankings, ending his 23 years in the top 16. He missed the Masters for the first time since his 1989 debut, and had to qualify to reach the main stages of subsequent ranking events. He qualified for the UK Championship, but lost 3–6 to Maguire in the first round. He lost 1–5 to James Wattana in the German Masters qualifiers, failing to reach the final stages of a ranking tournament for the first time in 15 years. He qualified for the Welsh Open by whitewashing Kurt Maflin 4–0, and then defeated reigning Masters champion Neil Robertson 4–1 in the first round. However, he was whitewashed 0–4 by Mark Allen in the second round. Hendry played Robertson again in the first round of the World Open after he defeated Mike Dunn 5–2 in qualifying, but lost 3–5. Hendry defeated Yu Delu 5–1 to qualify for the China Open, where he defeated Martin Gould 5–4 in the first round, winning on the final black. He played Robertson for the third consecutive time in a ranking event, but lost 3–5.

Retirement (2012)

Hendry ensured he would make his 27th consecutive appearance at the main stage of the 2012 World Championship when he defeated Yu 10–6 in the qualifiers. He made a 147 in his 10–4 first-round defeat of Bingham, his third maximum break at the Crucible and the 11th of his career. He defeated the defending champion Higgins 13–4 in the second round, his first victory over his compatriot in a ranking event since 2003, to reach his 19th world quarter-final. However, after losing 2–13 to Maguire in the quarter-finals, Hendry announced his retirement from professional snooker at the age of 43, citing dissatisfaction with his standard of play and difficulty balancing competitive, commercial, and personal commitments. He stated that he had decided three months earlier to retire at the end of the season.

Return to the professional tour (2021–present)
In August 2020, Hendry reached the semi-finals of the World Seniors Championship. The following month, citing improvements in his form and confidence, he accepted an invitational tour card to play on the main World Snooker Tour for two seasons. After delaying his return to competition several times during the 2020–21 season, he played his first professional match in almost nine years at the 2021 Gibraltar Open, losing 1–4 to Matthew Selt in the first round. He also entered the 2021 World Championship, where he won his first-round qualifier 6–3 against Jimmy White, but lost 1–6 to Xu Si in the second qualifying round.

During the 2021–22 season, Hendry competed in six ranking events between August and November 2021, but did not progress beyond the last 64 in any of them. He defeated Chris Wakelin 3–2 in the first round of the 2021 British Open, but was whitewashed 0–3 by Gary Wilson in the second round. He defeated Michael White 4–1 to qualify for the 2021 English Open, but was whitewashed 0–4 in the first round by Wakelin, scoring just 18 points in the match. He lost in the qualifiers for the 2021 Scottish Open, the January 2022 European Masters, and the 2022 German Masters. After a 1–6 defeat to Thepchaiya Un-Nooh in the first round of the 2021 UK Championship, he did not compete in any further professional events for the remainder of the season. He opted not to enter the 2022 World Championship qualifiers, stating that he had not been practising enough to be competitive, which led to speculation that he would abandon his comeback plans. However, Hendry confirmed that he intended to continue on the tour.

In April 2022, Hendry's invitational tour card was renewed for a further two seasons, despite complaints from some players and concerns from snooker's governing body about his limited participation on the tour, given that he had competed in just eight events over the preceding two seasons. At the beginning of the 2022–23 season, he was whitewashed 0–5 by Mark Joyce in qualifying for the 2022 European Masters, and lost 1–4 to Zhang Anda in qualifying for the 2022 British Open. After these defeats, the Daily Mirror criticised Hendry's "disastrous comeback", claiming that the 53-year-old had "struggled to adapt against the competition on tour amid raised standards in the profesional game". Hendry withdrew from the 2022 Northern Ireland Open, and also withdrew from the 2022 UK Championship when the qualifying schedule conflicted with his broadcasting work for ITV at the 2022 Champion of Champions. He played his third professional match of the season in the 2023 German Masters qualifiers, but was whitewashed 0–5 by Matthew Stevens. In December 2022, at which point Hendry had won just three out of 14 matches since returning to the professional tour, former World Snooker chairman Barry Hearn suggested that Hendry should not tarnish his legacy by continuing if he could not be competitive. In January 2023, Hendry disclosed that the WPBSA had fined him for withdrawing from tournaments while appearing on The Masked Singer.

Status
At the time of his initial retirement in 2012, Hendry was the most successful player in professional snooker history. He had earned nearly £9 million in prize money, more than any other player. He held records for the most world titles in the modern era (7), the most ranking titles (36), the most Triple Crown titles (18), and the most centuries in professional competition (775). However, many of Hendry's records were subsequently equalled or broken by other players, notably O'Sullivan. As of 2022, O'Sullivan has equalled Hendry's record of seven world titles, won 39 ranking titles and 21 Triple Crown titles, and made over 1,100 centuries in professional competition. Judd Trump, John Higgins, and Neil Robertson have also surpassed Hendry's total of career century breaks.

Dennis Taylor and Ray Reardon have argued that O'Sullivan has superseded Hendry as the sport's greatest player. In 2005, John Higgins, who competed with both players at their respective peaks, concurred, proclaiming O'Sullivan as "the best that's ever played the game". Steve Davis is more divided on the issue, considering O'Sullivan to be the best player but Hendry the greatest winner. White also regards O'Sullivan as the best player, but considers Davis his toughest opponent. Dell Hill, a snooker coach who has worked with some of the game's top players, also considers O'Sullivan the best player "without a shadow of a doubt", but as of 2015 believed that O'Sullivan had "under-achieved" next to Hendry. Sean Ingle, chief sports journalist for The Guardian, continues to make the case for Hendry as the sport's greatest player.

O’Sullivan has dismissed the suggestion that he is the greatest player and has identified Hendry as the greatest due to his having dominated the sport in the 1990s. Hendry himself has identified O’Sullivan as the greatest player he has played against, but considers he would triumph in a match if both players played at their peak. After O’Sullivan equalled Hendry's seven world titles in 2022, each player paid tribute to the other, with O'Sullivan saying: “[Hendry] used to play six hours a day and didn’t miss a ball. There is no one dominating the sport like he did, like Tiger Woods did”. Hendry said of O'Sullivan during the 2022 World Championship: “You cannot play better snooker than that. He is just supreme in all departments”.

Personal life
Hendry was born in South Queensferry, West Lothian, brought up in Gorgie, Edinburgh, and then Dalgety Bay, Fife, where he attended Inverkeithing High School. He later returned to Kirkliston, attending nearby Queensferry High School from the age of fourteen, and lived in a flat in South Queensferry during the early part of his professional career. He met his future wife Amanda (Mandy) Tart at a Pontins holiday camp when he was 16. The couple married in 1995 and settled in Auchterarder. They have two sons, Blaine (born 1996) and Carter (born 2004). In 2014, Hendry left his wife after 19 years of marriage and moved to England to pursue a relationship with 26-year-old children's entertainer and actress Lauren Thundow, whom he had met at a snooker event the previous year. In 2021, his ex-wife sold their former home in Auchterarder, which she had received as part of their divorce settlement, for around £875,000.

Hendry has a single-figure golf handicap. He enjoys poker and has appeared in several televised tournaments. Hendry is also keenly interested in football, supporting Scottish side Hearts and English side Chelsea F.C.

In August 2011, HM Revenue and Customs successfully applied to Glasgow Sheriff Court to liquidate the assets of Stephen Hendry Snooker Ltd, the company set up to manage Hendry's sponsorships and promotion, following its failure to pay an £85,000 tax bill.

In 2022, he launched a YouTube channel, Stephen Hendry's Cue Tips.

In 2023, he took part in the fourth series of The Masked Singer as "Rubbish", and finished the competition in 9th place.

Performance and rankings timeline

Career finals

Ranking finals: 57 (36 titles)

Non-ranking finals: 64 (39 titles)

* It was decided by aggregate score over five frames. 
** There was no play-off. Title decided on league table only.

Team finals: 7 (4 titles)

Amateur finals: 3 (3 titles)

Awards

References

External links

Stephen Hendry at worldsnooker.com
Player Profile on Snooker.org
Stephen Hendry Snooker And Pool Club

1969 births
Living people
Masters (snooker) champions
UK champions (snooker)
Members of the Order of the British Empire
People educated at Inverkeithing High School
Sportspeople from Edinburgh
Scottish snooker players
World number one snooker players
BBC sports presenters and reporters
People from South Queensferry
People associated with Fife
Winners of the professional snooker world championship
Snooker writers and broadcasters
Scottish YouTubers